Floquet theory is a branch of the theory of ordinary differential equations relating to the class of solutions to periodic linear differential equations of the form

with  a piecewise continuous periodic function with period  and defines the state of the stability of solutions.

It gives a coordinate change  with  that transforms the periodic system to a traditional linear system with constant, real coefficients.

When applied to physical systems with periodic potentials, such as crystals in condensed matter physics, the result is known as Bloch's theorem.

Note that the solutions of the linear differential equation form a vector space. A matrix  is called a fundamental matrix solution if all columns are linearly independent solutions. A matrix  is called a principal fundamental matrix solution if all columns are linearly independent solutions and there exists  such that  is the identity. A principal fundamental matrix can be constructed from a fundamental matrix using . The solution of the linear differential equation with the initial condition  is  where  is any fundamental matrix solution.

Floquet's theorem  
Let  be a linear first order differential equation,
Let  be a fundamental matrix solution of this differential equation. Then, for all ,

Here

is known as the monodromy matrix.
In addition, for each matrix  (possibly complex) such that

there is a  periodic (period ) matrix function  such that

Also, there is a real matrix  and a real periodic (period-) matrix function  such that

Consequences and applications 
This mapping  gives rise to a time-dependent change of coordinates, under which our original system becomes a linear system with real constant coefficients . Since  is continuous and periodic it must be bounded.

The representation  is called a Floquet normal form for the fundamental matrix .

They are also the eigenvalues of the (linear) Poincaré maps . A Floquet exponent (sometimes called a characteristic exponent), is a complex  such that  is a characteristic multiplier of the system. Notice that Floquet exponents are not unique, since , where  is an integer. The real parts of the Floquet exponents are called Lyapunov exponents. The zero solution is asymptotically stable if all Lyapunov exponents are negative, Lyapunov stable if the Lyapunov exponents are nonpositive and unstable otherwise.

 Floquet theory is very important for the study of dynamical systems.
 Floquet theory shows stability in Hill differential equation (introduced by George William Hill) approximating the motion of the moon as a harmonic oscillator in a periodic gravitational field.
 Bond softening and bond hardening in intense laser fields can be described in terms of solutions obtained from the Floquet theorem.

References 

C. Chicone. Ordinary Differential Equations with Applications. Springer-Verlag, New York 1999.
M.S.P. Eastham, "The Spectral Theory of Periodic Differential Equations", Texts in Mathematics, Scottish Academic Press, Edinburgh, 1973. .
 
 
 , Translation of Mathematical Monographs, 19, 294p.
W. Magnus, S. Winkler. Hill's Equation, Dover-Phoenix Editions, .
N.W. McLachlan, Theory and Application of Mathieu Functions, New York: Dover, 1964.

External links
 

Dynamical systems